"La Espero" is a poem written by Polish-Jewish doctor L. L. Zamenhof (1859–1917), the initiator of the Esperanto language. The song is often used as the (unofficial) anthem of Esperanto, and is now usually sung to a triumphal march composed by Félicien Menu de Ménil in 1909 (although there is an earlier, less martial tune created in 1891 by Claes Adelsköld, along with a number of other lesser-known tunes). It is sometimes referred to as the hymn of the Esperanto movement.

Some Esperantists object to the use of terms like "hymn" or "anthem" for La Espero, arguing that these terms have religious and nationalist overtones, respectively.

Lyrics

See also
 Esperanto music
 The Internationale
 Ode to Joy

References

External links

Esperanto culture
Esperanto music
Anthems
Anti-war songs